Joliet Township may refer to one of the following places in the United States:

 Joliet Township, Will County, Illinois
 Joliet Township, Platte County, Nebraska

Township name disambiguation pages